Kampong Chhnang is the capital city of Kampong Chhnang Province, in central Cambodia.

It is located just west of the Tonlé Sap River and is a noted port. The small city is connected to Phnom Penh by a national highway route and railway. Phnom Kong Rei is a landmark located north of the city across the Tonle Sap River.

The economy of the area is dominated by rice production and many locals live on floating fishing villages during the high-water monsoon season.

References

External links
Kampong Chhnang map
Kampong Chhnang at the Cambodia National and Provincial Resources Data Bank
Kampong Chhnang official tourism site
Kampong Chhnang images

Provincial capitals in Cambodia
Cities in Cambodia
Populated places in Kampong Chhnang province